Rabor (also Romanized as Rābor and Raber; also known as Rābur and Rāhbur) is a city and capital of Rabor County, Kerman Province, Iran.  At the 2006 census, its population was 12,386, in 2,734 families.

References

Populated places in Rabor County

Cities in Kerman Province